Ajda 1990 is Turkish pop singer Ajda Pekkan's twelfth studio album, which was released on 14 April 1990 in Turkey. The album was released in France and Turkey, thus the combination of French and Turkish titles. Half the songs are original Turkish compositions written especially for the album, while half are cover versions.

Track listing

Personnel
Ajda Pekkan: Vocals
Jeyan Erpi, Özkan Uğur, Cihan Okan, Sevingül Bahadır, Neco, Sertab Altın, Atilla Atasoy: Vocals
Fuat Güner: Electric Guitars, Vocals
Garo Mafyan: Keyboards
Selçuk Başar: Keyboards, Guitars, MIDI Controlled Guitar
Uğur Başar: Bass
Seyhun Çelik: Goblet Drum
Atilla Yılmaz: Bouzouki
Halil Karaduman: Kanun (a large zither used especially in the Middle East)

References

External links 
 
 Ajda 90 - iTunes

Ajda Pekkan albums
1990 albums
Turkish-language albums
French-language albums